The China Printing Museum is a museum dedicated to printing in Beijing, China.Established in 1996, the China Printing Plate Museum is the largest museum on printing in the world. The China Printing Museum displays the invention and evolution of Chinese printing. The museum has collected many collections of printing equipment, printed manuscripts, ceramics and other exhibits.

It is situated inside the  campus at Qingyuanlu Station of subway line 4, in Daxing District, Beijing.

See also 
  in Yangzhou

References

Museums in Beijing
Printing press museums
Decorative arts museums in China
Science museums in China
History museums in China
1996 establishments in China
University museums in China